Roder is a village in the commune of Munshausen, in northern Luxembourg.  , the village has a population of 66.

References

External links 
 

Munshausen
Villages in Luxembourg